National Highway 713A (NH 713A) is a National Highway in North East India that connects Hoj and Pappu in Arunachal Pradesh.

See also
 List of National Highways in India (by Highway Number)
 National Highways Development Project

References

1A
1A
National highways in India